Lamia El Aaraje (born 22 November 1986) is a Moroccan-born French politician who briefly represented the 15th constituency of Paris in the National Assembly from 2021 to 2022.

A member of the Socialist Party (PS), she was elected in a 6 June 2021 by-election following the resignation of George Pau-Langevin. On 28 January 2022, the Constitutional Council nullified her election, ruling it was held irregularly. The seat remained vacant until the June 2022 legislative election, in which El Aaraje competed again, but was defeated by Danielle Simonnet of La France Insoumise (FI).

Education and professional life
Born in Rabat, El Aaraje arrived in Limoges, France in 2004 to study pharmacy. She holds a doctorate in pharmacy; in October 2013 she defended a thèse d'exercice on the "Evolution of the concepts of public health and health education and the role of the School in their promotion".

At the same time, she completed her training by becoming a lawyer in health and drug law. Lamia El Aaraje began her professional career at the Haute Autorité de santé as an intern, before joining the parliamentary team of Haute-Garonne Socialist MP Catherine Lemorton, who presided over the Committee on Social Affairs in the 14th National Assembly. She subsequently worked as an executive in mutual health organisations (Mutuelle des Étudiants and Intériale Mutuelle).

Political career
Joining the Socialist Party in the 2010s, Lamia El Aaraje became involved in various left-wing youth organisations during her university studies. Within the Young Socialist Movement, she participated in the local and national animation of a reformist sensibility. In particular, she spearheaded this sensitivity on many thematic health projects in preparation for the 2012 presidential election.

In the 2020 Paris municipal election, she was elected to the Council of Paris, where she has presided over its 3rd commission (public space, security and transport) since July 2020. She has also been a councillor of the 20th arrondissement of Paris since April 2014.

In June 2021, following the resignation from Parliament of George Pau-Langevin who had become deputy to the Defender of Rights, El Aaraje won the by-election in the 15th constituency of Paris with 56.5% of the second-round vote against Danielle Simonnet of La France Insoumise. Her victory, in a constituency historically anchored on the left, marked the end of a campaign lasting several months due to the health crisis and the postponement of the election due to the COVID-19 pandemic.

In January 2022 however, the Constitutional Council nullified her election and declared the seat vacant. One of the candidates in the 2021 by-election had "fraudulently" shown the support of La République En Marche! for his candidacy on the ballot.

In the 2022 legislative election, El Aaraje declared she would run for a full term as the Socialist nominee in the 15th constituency, despite the New Ecological and Social People's Union (NUPES) coalition (of which the Socialist Party is part) deciding that La France Insoumise candidate Danielle Simonnet would be their joint candidate. While the NUPES described El Aaraje's candidacy as a "dissident" run, she was supported by former Socialist Prime Minister Lionel Jospin. She also benefited from the support of Paris Mayor Anne Hidalgo, whose policies she defends in the Council of Paris and whom she called to run for President of France in the 2022 presidential election. El Aaraje came a distant second place in the first round, before she faced Simonnet in the second round. She decisively lost the seat she had previously held.

See also
List of by-elections to the 15th National Assembly of France

References

External links
  National Assembly page

1986 births
Living people
Deputies of the 15th National Assembly of the French Fifth Republic
Members of Parliament for Paris
People from Rabat
Councillors of Paris
Socialist Party (France) politicians
Moroccan emigrants to France
21st-century French women politicians
Women members of the National Assembly (France)
University of Limoges alumni